Armand Carlos Netsing Takam (born 6 December 1980) is a Cameroonian-born French professional boxer. He has challenged once for the unified WBA (Super), IBF, and IBO heavyweight titles against in 2017. As an amateur, he represented Cameroon at the 2004 Olympics.

Early life
Carlos Takam was born in Douala, Cameroon. He competed as an amateur boxer for his home country of Cameroon. He later moved to France and holds both French and Cameroonian citizenship.

Amateur career
Takam competed at the 2003 All-Africa Games in Abuja, Nigeria, Takam captured the bronze medal in his weight division.

In 2004 he represented his native country, Cameroon, at the 2004 Summer Olympics in Athens, Greece but was beaten in the round of sixteen by Egypt's Mohamed Aly. Takam qualified for the Athens Games by winning the gold medal at the 1st AIBA African 2004 Olympic Qualifying Tournament in Casablanca, Morocco. In the decisive final of the event he defeated Angolan fighter Georgio Cabta.

Professional career

Early career
Takam made his professional debut in France on 10 December 2005, when he defeated Zine Eddine Benmakhlouf of Belgium. He went on to build up a record of 17-0 by the end of 2008. His first loss as a professional came in June 2009, when he lost to undefeated French prospect Grégory Tony by unanimous decision over eight rounds. Following this loss Takam went on to gain four knockout wins by the end of 2010. Takam’s first fight of 2011 was against Gbenga Oluokun of Nigeria. Takam won the bout by stoppage in the sixth round after Oluokun retired on his stool. Takam picked up the vacant WBO Africa heavyweight title by beating Oluokun. He went on to beat Samir Kurtagić on 2 December 2011.

Takam next fought on 31 March 2012, when he faced former world title challenger Frans Botha. Takam won the fight by knockout in the 11th round to retain his WBO Africa heavyweight title and also pick up to vacant WBF International heavyweight title. Takam went on to fight two more times in 2012, defeating Thomas Mrazek and Ivica Perkovic.

On 24 May 2013, Takam took on former world title challenger Michael Grant. Takam knocked Grant out in the eighth round to claim the WBF heavyweight title. Takam fought again in December 2013, when he knocked out Jakov Gospic in three rounds.

Career from 2014–2015

Takam vs. Perez

Takam made his HBO debut on 18 January 2014 against Cuban Mike Perez. The fight started slowly, with little action in the first five rounds, however, Takam took over starting in round six, as he planted his feet inside and was able to work Perez over. The Cuban's arms got heavier and heavier as the fight went on, and he didn't seem to have his usual snap or speed . Takam was able to hurt Perez in round six and round ten.

BLH had the fight 97–93 for Takam, giving him rounds six through ten after a 3–2 start in Perez's favour. Official scores were 96–94 (Michael Buffer did not announce who got that card) and 95–95 two times for the majority draw.

Takam vs. Thompson

On 6 June 2014 Takam took on Tony Thompson, (39-5-0, 26KOs) at the Palais des Sport Marcel Cerdan in Paris, France. The 33-year-old Takam aggressively took the fight to the 42-year-old Thompson. Thompson had some success counter-punching, but Takam’s relentless work-rate overwhelmed Thompson at times. Takam dominated the fight and began to punish Thompson more and more as the bout progressed. Takam won the fight by unanimous decision with scores of 117–111, 117–111, and 119–109 to win the vacant WBC Silver heavyweight title.

Takam vs. Povetkin

In October 2014 Takam faced Russian Alexander Povetkin (27-1-0, 19KOs)  at the Luzhiniki Palace of Sports in Moscow, Russia. In a close fight that was a contender for fight of the year, Takam lost the fight via 10th round KO after Poventkin landed a left hook to the head of Takam.

Takam vs. Nascimento, Sprott, Arias 
Takam fought three times in 2015, defeating Marcelo Luiz Nascimento and Michael Sprott by knockout and George Arias by unanimous decision in an eight round bout.

Career from 2016–2017

Takam vs. Parker

On 21 May 2016 Carlos Takam fought Joseph Parker in an IBF heavyweight title eliminator. The winner would be required to fight for the world title against the reigning champion, Anthony Joshua of Britain. Prior to the fight being announced, Parker and his handlers twice avoided fighting Takam the previous year because of the risk involved. The fight took place with Parker winning a unanimous decision after twelve rounds, in front of a vocal home crowd at South Auckland's Vodafone Events Centre in New Zealand. Two judges scored it 116–112, and one at 115–113. Despite the result the fight was very close until the end with Takam landing painful and dangerous combinations of shots.

Takam vs. Rekowski, Bacurin 
Takam’s first fight of 2017 took place on 29 January, when he faced Marcin Rekowski of Poland. Takam won the fight by fourth round knockout. He next fought in June 2017, Defeating Ivica Bacurin by knockout in the second round.

World title challenge

Takam vs. Joshua

On 16 October 2017, Takam was made a late replacement to fight Anthony Joshua on 28 October at the Principality Stadium, Cardiff, after Joshua's original opponent Kubrat Pulev pulled out of their fight with a shoulder injury. Takam gave a brave performance and took Joshua 10 rounds before the referee stepped in and waved the fight off after Joshua landed a flurry of punches.

Career from 2018

Takam vs. Chisora

On 15 June 2018, it was confirmed that Takam would face Derek Chisora on 28 July at The O2 Arena, London, England, on the undercard of Dillian Whyte vs. Joseph Parker. Chisora knocked out Takam in the 8th round in an exciting battle, although Takam had dominated the early rounds and was ahead on the judges' scorecards when he was knocked out.

Takam vs. Gashi 
On 22 December, 2018, Takam fought Senad Gashi. Takam was outlanding Gashi for most of the fight. In the eighth, Takam managed to drop Gashi three times, the third time also being the final one that prompted the referee to wave off the fight.

Takam vs. Lewis, Maldonado, Forrest 
Following his victory against Gashi, Takam would go on to record three consecutive ten-round unanimous decision victories. The first came on 14 September 2019 against Craig Lewis in Monticello, New York, with Takam winning via scores of 99–91, 99–91, 96–94. His next fight on 28 February 2020 also took place in the state of New York, this time in Huntington against Fábio Maldonado, which he won by shutout unanimous decision. On 9 July 2020, Takam fought Jerry Forrest. Takam stepped in to fight Forrest on short notice, which was noticeable especially in the later rounds. Takam was able to build up an early lead, however, which was enough to win an all three judges' scorecards, 98–92, 97–93 and 96–94.

Takam vs. Joyce 
On 16 June 2021, it was announced that Takam's next fight would be against undefeated Joe Joyce on 24 July at the SSE Arena, London. After a slow start from Joyce on the night, in which Takam landed numerous punches to the head and body of Joyce in the opening rounds, Takam was staggered by his opponent at the start of the sixth round, overwhelmed with a barrage of punches which forced referee Steve Gray to halt the fight. The official result was a sixth-round technical knockout victory for Joyce.

Professional boxing record

Pay-per-view bouts

References

External links

 
Carlos Takam - Profile, News Archive & Current Rankings at Box.Live

1980 births
Living people
Sportspeople from Douala
Heavyweight boxers
Boxers at the 2004 Summer Olympics
Olympic boxers of Cameroon
Cameroonian male boxers
African Games bronze medalists for Cameroon
African Games medalists in boxing
Competitors at the 2003 All-Africa Games